Tazlarovo (Taźlar stantsiyahı) is a rural locality (a village) in Novokiyeshkinsky Selsoviet, Karmaskalinsky District, Bashkortostan, Russia. The population was 69 as of 2010. There is 1 street.

Geography 
Tazlarovo is located 26 km southeast of Karmaskaly (the district's administrative centre) by road. Tubyak-Tazlarovo is the nearest rural locality.

References 

Rural localities in Karmaskalinsky District